The Algerian mouse (Mus spretus), also known as the western Mediterranean mouse, is a wild species of mouse closely related to the house mouse, native to open habitats around the western Mediterranean.

Description 

The Algerian mouse closely resembles the house mouse in appearance, and can be most easily distinguished from that species by its shorter tail. It has brownish fur over most of the body, with distinct white or buff underparts.

Distribution and habitat 
The Algerian mouse inhabits south-western Europe and the western Mediterranean coast of Africa. It is found throughout mainland Portugal, and in all but the most northerly parts of Spain. Its range extends east of the Pyrenees into southern France, where it is found in south-eastern regions around Toulouse and up the Rhone valley to Valence. It is also found throughout the Balearic Islands. In Africa, it is found in the Maghreb regions of Morocco, Algeria, Tunisia, and western Libya, north of the Sahara desert. Also, a small population occurs on the coast of eastern Libya.

It prefers open terrain, avoiding dense forests, and is most commonly found in temperate grassland, arable land, and rural gardens. It can typically be found in areas of grassland or open scrub, where shrubs and tall grasses can help obscure it from predators, but where plenty of open ground is available. Although it is considered a fully wild species, avoiding humans, it may occasionally be found in abandoned buildings.

Behaviour and ecology 
The Algerian mouse is primarily nocturnal. It is an opportunistic omnivore, primarily feeding on grass seeds, fruit, and insects. It has been reported to require only two-thirds the volume of drinking water required by the house mouse. As a relatively unspecialised small mammal, it is preyed on by a number of predators, including owls, mammalian carnivores, and snakes.

Although they defend at least the core areas of their ranges from other mice, they are less aggressive than house mice, establishing dominance through ritual behaviour rather than overt violence. The mice have been reported to clear away their own faeces from areas they regularly inhabit or use, either by picking up the droppings in their mouths or pushing them along the ground with their snouts. This hygienic behaviour is notably different from that of the closely related house mouse.

In laboratory conditions, male Algerian mice show care for their offspring, including gathering and protecting their young and sharing nests. In field conditions, male Algerian mice not only provide care for their offspring but also participate in territorial defense and food provisioning. Males play a significant role in ensuring the survival and well-being of their offspring.

Reproduction 
Algerian mice breed for nine months of the year, but are sexually inactive from November to January. Although they can breed during any other month, they have two breeding seasons during which they are particularly active. In April and May, adults surviving from the previous year produce a new generation of mice, then both they and their new offspring breed during the second peak in August to September. Gestation lasts 19 to 20 days, and results in the birth of two to 10 blind and hairless pups, with about five being average.

The young begin to develop fur at two to four days, their ears open at three to five days, and their eyes open at 12 to 14. The young begin to eat solid food as soon as they are able to see, but are not fully weaned for about three or four weeks, leaving the nest shortly thereafter. They reach the full adult size at eight to nine weeks, by which time they are already sexually mature. They have been reported to live up to 15 months.

Hybridization 
Biologist Michael Kohn of Rice University in Houston, Texas and his associate believed that they "caught evolution in the act" while studying mice resistant to warfarin in a German bakery. Genetic study revealed that the supposed house mice, Mus musculus, carried a significant amount of Algerian mouse DNA in their chromosomes and a gene (VKOR, which has been thought to appear first in Mus spretus and perpetuate because it has helped the mice to survive while eating vitamin K-deficient diets) that confers resistance to warfarin. The discovery was believed to have evolutionary importance because this was the first time hybridization had been shown to result in a positive consequence.

Taxonomy and evolution 
Five recognised species of the genus Mus are native to Europe. M. musculus is the house mouse, which primarily inhabits human dwellings and other structures, although it may occasionally return to the wild as feral populations. The Algerian mouse is one of the four remaining wild species; although its exact relationship to the house mouse is unclear, it may represent the earliest evolutionary divergence within the group. The remaining European species are the Macedonian mouse, the steppe mouse and the Cypriot mouse.

In any event, it is sufficiently closely related that male house mice can breed with female Algerian to produce viable offspring, although this has only been observed in captivity, and does not appear to occur in the wild, perhaps because the two species inhabit different habitats. Male hybrids of these unions are sterile, but female hybrids are not. In contrast, male Algerian mice do not breed with female house mice, violently driving them away.

The oldest fossils of the species date back 40,000 years, and were found in Morocco. Along with evidence based on modern genetic diversity, this suggests that the species first arose in Africa, and only later migrated north to Europe, perhaps with the expansion of agricultural land into the continent during the Neolithic.

References 

Mus (rodent)
Rodents of Europe
Mammals described in 1883
Taxonomy articles created by Polbot
Rodents of Africa